José Pedro Monteiro (born 27 July 1959) is a Portuguese windsurfer. He competed in the Windglider event at the 1984 Summer Olympics.

References

External links
 
 

1959 births
Living people
Portuguese windsurfers
Portuguese male sailors (sport)
Olympic sailors of Portugal
Sailors at the 1984 Summer Olympics – Windglider
Place of birth missing (living people)